Empar Moliner Ballesteros (Santa Eulàlia de Ronçana, Barcelona, 1966) is a Spanish writer and journalist. She works for the newspapers El País, Avui, and appears in several TV and radio programs as Minoria Absoluta (RAC 1), El matí de Catalunya Ràdio and Els matins (TV3). In 2000, she received the Josep Pla Award.

Published books
 L'Ensenyador de pisos que odiava els mims. 
 Feli, esthéticienne. (Josep Pla Prize 2000) 
 T'estimo si he begut. (Lletra d'Or Prize 2005) 
 Busco senyor per amistat i el que sorgeixi. 
 Desitja guardar els canvis?

External links

Empar Moliner's Blog (in Spanish) 
Blog about Empar Moliner

1966 births
Living people
Writers from Catalonia
Journalists from Catalonia
Spanish women writers
El País people
El País columnists